National Party (PN) was a Colombian nationalist political party. The Party was established in 1886 and dissolved in 1902.

Presidents 

 Rafael Núñez : 1887–1888
 Carlos Holguín Mallarino : 1888–1892
 Miguel Antonio Caro : 1892–1898
 Manuel Antonio Sanclemente : 1898–1900

Defunct political parties in Colombia
Political parties established in 1886
Political parties disestablished in 1902
Colombian nationalism
1886 establishments in Colombia
1902 disestablishments in Colombia
Nationalist parties in South America